5th Politburo may refer to:
5th Politburo of the Chinese Communist Party
5th Politburo of the Communist Party of Cuba
5th Politburo of the Party of Labour of Albania
5th Politburo of the Communist Party of Czechoslovakia
5th Politburo of the Socialist Unity Party of Germany
5th Politburo of the Polish United Workers' Party
5th Politburo of the Romanian Communist Party
5th Politburo of the Lao People's Revolutionary Party
5th Politburo of the Communist Party of Vietnam
5th Politburo of the Communist Party of Yugoslavia
5th Politburo of the Hungarian Working People's Party
5th Political Committee of the Workers' Party of Korea